Georgi Peev (born 11 March 1979) is a former Bulgarian footballer who played as a midfielder.

Career
A youth product of Lokomotiv Sofia he spent three seasons in the Bulgarian A Group with the first team before switching to Dynamo Kyiv, winning six major honours with the Ukrainian club. In January 2007, he moved to Amkar Perm in Russia.

He was capped 45 times for Bulgaria from his debut in 1999, appearing at the UEFA Euro 2004.

Career
Peev started his career in home town Sofia in local club Lokomotiv. He made his official debut for his native club in a match against Litex Lovech on 8 August 1998. He played for 13 minutes as a substitute. On 5 December 1998 he scored his first goal in professional football against Spartak Varna. He scored goal in the 10th minute. Peev was discovered at the age of 21 by Dynamo Kyiv manager Valery Lobanovsky, while playing for Lokomotiv, and signed for €2,5 million. He has also played for FC Dnipro Dnipropetrovsk.

On 16 January 2007, Peev signed with Amkar Perm for a reported fee of €500,000. In 2008, he was chosen the fans favorite player of the Russian Premier League and received a rare revolver from 1936 used by the Red Army.

International career
A right back or right winger known for his pace and attacking attitude, he was part of the Bulgarian 2004 European Football Championship team who exited in the first round, finishing bottom of Group C, having finished top of Qualifying Group 8 in the pre-tournament phase. Between 1999 and 2007 Peev featured in 40 games for Bulgaria.
On 10 May 2010, following his strong performances for his club team, Peev was recalled to the national side for the friendly match against Belgium.
On 27 March 2011, Georgi Peev announced his retirement from international football.

Honours
 Dynamo Kyiv
 Ukrainian Championship (3): 2001, 2003, 2004
 Ukrainian Cup (2): 2003, 2005
 Ukrainian Super Cup (1): 2004

Personal
His brother Daniel Peev is also a professional footballer.

References

External links
 

1979 births
Living people
Footballers from Sofia
Bulgarian footballers
Bulgaria international footballers
FC Lokomotiv 1929 Sofia players
FC Dynamo Kyiv players
FC Dnipro players
FC Amkar Perm players
Bulgarian expatriate footballers
Expatriate footballers in Ukraine
Bulgarian expatriate sportspeople in Ukraine
Expatriate footballers in Russia
Bulgarian expatriate sportspeople in Russia
UEFA Euro 2004 players
First Professional Football League (Bulgaria) players
Russian Premier League players
Ukrainian Premier League players
Association football midfielders